Matica is a former settlement in the Municipality of Trbovlje in central Slovenia. It is now part of the village of Župa. The area is part of the traditional region of Lower Carniola. It is now included with the rest of the municipality in the Central Sava Statistical Region.

Geography
Matica lies in the northern part of Župa, below the southeast slope of Kožlak Hill.

History
Matica had a population of 79 living in 12 houses in 1880, and 88 living in 12 houses in 1900. Together with part of neighboring  Ključevica, Matica was merged into the newly created settlement of Župa in 1955, ending its existence as an independent settlement.

References

External links
Matica at Geopedia

Populated places in the Municipality of Trbovlje
Former settlements in Slovenia